Edward Francis (3 June 1930 – 11 April 2017) was a Roman Catholic bishop. Ordained to the priesthood in 1957, Francis served as bishop of the Diocese of Sivagangai, India, from 1987 until 2005.

See also
Catholic Church in India

Notes

1930 births
2017 deaths
20th-century Roman Catholic bishops in India
Place of birth missing
Place of death missing
21st-century Roman Catholic bishops in India